Two ships of the Royal Navy have borne the name HMS Hoste, after Captain Sir William Hoste. A third was planned, but entered service under a different name:

  was a  launched in 1916 and sunk in a collision with  later that year.
 HMS Hoste was to have been a frigate transferred under lend-lease.
  was a  transferred under lend-lease in 1943 and returned to the US Navy in 1945.

Royal Navy ship names